Munshi Wadud is a Bangladeshi film lyricist. He won Bangladesh National Film Award for Best Lyrics for the film Saajghor (2007).

Selected films

As a writer 
 71 Er Ma Jononi - 2014

As a lyricist
 Prem Deewana - 1993 
 Hangor Nodi Grenade - 1997
 Koti Takar Kabin - 2005
 Chachchu - 2006
 Ghani - 2006
 Saajghor - 2007
 Raja Surja Kha - 2012
 Ekee Britte - 2013
 71 Er Ma Jononi - 2014

Awards and nominations
National Film Awards

References

External links
 

Bangladeshi lyricists
Best Lyricist National Film Award (Bangladesh) winners
Year of birth missing (living people)
Living people